Thurlby railway station was a station in Thurlby by Bourne, Lincolnshire on the Bourn and Essendine Railway between Essendine and Bourne. It was closed in 1951.

History

The station opened on 16 May 1860.

It closed on 18 June 1951.

References

   (Includes fine photograph of Thurlby station.)

External links
Thurlby Station on navigable 1946 O.S. map
Private web site with early photograph of Thurlby station

Disused railway stations in Lincolnshire
Former Great Northern Railway stations
Railway stations in Great Britain opened in 1860
Railway stations in Great Britain closed in 1951